The Punjab Information Technology Board (reporting name: PITB) was established in 1999 by the Government of the Punjab as an autonomous body under the Department of Industries, operating under the administration of Information Technology Department from 2001 to 2011. The key focus of the department was to monitor global opportunities, cater to the growing need for IT, develop policy initiatives, planning and implementation of initiatives to increase the competitiveness of the IT industry in the Punjab province. The Information Technology department was dissolved in 2011, and PITB was attached under the Planning & Development Department Punjab.

PITB acts as the foundation of an innovation economy in Punjab which aims at modernization of governance techniques by implementing transparency-induced governance techniques. Moreover, PITB focuses on improving the digital literacy of the citizen of the province. In addition to the above-mentioned role, the organization is dedicated to providing effective and efficient technical services and building IT infrastructure for governmental agencies and, national and international businesses.

PITB is considered the leader of technological innovation in Punjab, Pakistan which has developed, implemented, and successfully impacted the health, education, law & order, agriculture, and transport sector of the province. The organization is reviving the entrepreneurial culture in Pakistan by building the capacity of students as well as professionals from private and public sector by providing them training and business incubation facility (About Us: PITB, 2019).

Budget

References 

 
Government agencies of Punjab, Pakistan